is a railway station in the town of Gōdo, Anpachi District, Gifu Prefecture Japan, operated by the private railway operator Yōrō Railway.

Lines

Station layout
Higashi-Akasaka Station has two opposed ground-level side platforms connected by a level crossing. The station is unattended.

Platforms

Adjacent stations

|-
!colspan=5|Yōrō Railway

History
Higashi-Akasaka Station opened on January 1, 1914.

Passenger statistics
In fiscal 2015, the station was used by an average of 398 passengers daily (boarding passengers only).

Surrounding area
 Ogaki Women's College

See also
 List of Railway Stations in Japan

References

External links

 

Railway stations in Gifu Prefecture
Railway stations in Japan opened in 1914
Stations of Yōrō Railway
Gōdo, Gifu